Minuscule 120 (in the Gregory-Aland numbering), ε 1202 (Soden), is a Greek minuscule manuscript of the New Testament, on parchment leaves. Palaeographically it has been assigned to the 12th or 13th century. It has complex contents with some marginalia.

Description 

The codex contains a complete text of the Gospels of Matthew, Luke, John on 183 (177 + 6) parchment leaves (size ). The text is written in one column per page, 30 lines per page (size of text 12 by 8 cm). The large initial letters in gold, the ink is black.
The leaves 40-67 with Gospel of Mark were lost.

The text has also another division according to the smaller Ammonian Sections. It has no references to the Eusebian Canons.

Text 

The Greek text of the codex is a representative of the Byzantine text-type. Aland placed it in Category V.

According to Gregory textually it is very close to the codex 119.

According to the Claremont Profile Method it represents textual family Kx in Luke 1, Luke 10, and Luke 20.

It belongs to the textual cluster 17 along with manuscripts 30, 70, 287, 288, and 880.

History 

Formerly the manuscript belonged to St. Victor on the Walls. Probably it was used by Robert Estienne in his Editio Regia and was designed by him as ιδ'.

The manuscript was examined and described by Griesbach and Paulin Martin. C. R. Gregory saw it in 1885 and 1891.

It is currently housed at the Bibliothèque nationale de France (Supp. Gr. 185), at Paris.

See also 
 List of New Testament minuscules
 Biblical manuscript
 Textual criticism

References

Further reading 

 E. Colwell, "The Four Gospels of Karahissar" I (Chicago, 1936), pp. 170–222.

Greek New Testament minuscules
12th-century biblical manuscripts
Bibliothèque nationale de France collections